Route 160 is a -long east–west secondary highway in the northeast New Brunswick, Canada. In Saint-Isidore, the route is known as Boulevard des Fondateurs.

Route 160 starts at an intersection with Route 8 and Route 360 near Allardville. From there, it runs east through Saint-Isidore to its terminus at Route 150 in Losier Settlement.

History
Route 160 was commissioned in 1984 from portions of Route 135 (east of Saint-Isidore) and Route 360 (to the west). Both still exist in shortened form.

In 1989, when a new Route 8 alignment opened that bypassed Allardville to the west, Route 160 was extended 3 km further west along another former portion of Route 360 to meet up with the new highway.

Intersecting routes
 Route 135 in Saint-Isidore
 Route 365 in Saint-Isidore

River crossings
 Gaspereau Brook
 Pont-Landry

Communities along the Route
 Pont-Landry
 Boishebert
 Saint-Isidore
 Haut Saint-Isidore
 Bois-Gagnon
 Pokemouche Landing
 Saint-Sauveur
 Allardville East

See also
List of New Brunswick provincial highways

References

160
160